IRIB Omid, the teen channel, which is a separate channel operated by IRIB and titled Omid (means hope), launched on September 20, 2016.

References

External links

Television stations in Iran
Television channels and stations established in 2016